Newbury is a town in Merrimack County, New Hampshire, United States. The population was 2,172 at the 2020 census. Newbury is home to part of Lake Sunapee, including Mount Sunapee State Park Beach. Mount Sunapee Resort, a ski area in Mount Sunapee State Park, is in the west. The town includes the villages of Newbury, Blodgett Landing and South Newbury.

History 

Situated at the south end of Lake Sunapee, the town has gone through numerous name changes. It started in 1753 as "Dantzic", after the Baltic seaport. The first provincial grant in 1754 named the town "Hereford", in honor of Edward Devereaux, Viscount Hereford. Colonial Governor John Wentworth renewed the grant in 1772 under the name "Fishersfield", for his brother-in-law John Fisher. The town was finally incorporated as "Newbury" in 1837, as suggested by settlers originally from Newbury, Massachusetts.

The Fells Historic Site, located adjacent to the John Hay National Wildlife Refuge, is part of  protected of a forest country estate. Protection efforts have enabled Lake Sunapee to consistently be named one of the cleanest lakes in the state.

Geography
The northern half of the town drains into Lake Sunapee, which in turns drains west via the Sugar River into the Connecticut River and thence to Long Island Sound. The southern half of the town, including the eastern side of Mount Sunapee, drains via Andrew Brook and the West Branch of the Warner River to the Warner River, which flows east to the Contoocook River, then into the Merrimack River, and ultimately to the Gulf of Maine. 

The village of Newbury is located at the south end of Lake Sunapee near the geographic center of the town. The village is at the junction of New Hampshire Route 103 and 103A. Route 103 leads northwest, past the entrance to Mount Sunapee Resort (a state park) and into the town of Sunapee. To the southeast, Route 103 passes the village of South Newbury before entering the town of Bradford. Route 103A proceeds north, parallel to the east shore of Lake Sunapee, and passes the village of Blodgett Landing before entering the town of New London.

Adjacent municipalities 
 New London (north)
 Sutton (east)
 Bradford (south)
 Washington (southwest)
 Goshen (west)
 Sunapee (northwest)

Demographics

As of the census of 2000, there were 1,702 people, 691 households, and 507 families residing in the town.  The population density was 47.5 people per square mile (18.4/km).  There were 1,311 housing units at an average density of 36.6 per square mile (14.1/km).  The racial makeup of the town was 98.35% White, 0.41% African American, 0.06% Native American, 0.12% Asian, 0.29% from other races, and 0.76% from two or more races. Hispanic or Latino of any race were 1.18% of the population.

There were 691 households, out of which 30.7% had children under the age of 18 living with them, 63.5% were married couples living together, 6.9% had a female householder with no husband present, and 26.5% were non-families. 20.7% of all households were made up of individuals, and 8.0% had someone living alone who was 65 years of age or older.  The average household size was 2.46 and the average family size was 2.84.

In the town, the population was spread out, with 22.8% under the age of 18, 4.8% from 18 to 24, 28.3% from 25 to 44, 28.0% from 45 to 64, and 16.2% who were 65 years of age or older.  The median age was 42 years. For every 100 females, there were 102.9 males.  For every 100 females age 18 and over, there were 97.3 males.

The median income for a household in the town was $58,026, and the median income for a family was $61,389. Males had a median income of $42,031 versus $29,022 for females. The per capita income for the town was $29,521.  None of the families and 1.8% of the population were living below the poverty line, including none under eighteen and none of those over 64.

Notable people

 John Milton Hay (1838–1905), 37th United States Secretary of State

Sites of interest 
 Bell Cove Historic Caboose Museum
 The Fells Historic Site
The Center Meeting House
Veterans Memorial at Newbury

References

External links

 
 New Hampshire Economic and Labor Market Information Bureau Profile
 Mount Sunapee State Park
 Lake Sunapee Protective Association
 Lake Sunapee - History - Old Photos and Postcards

 
Towns in Merrimack County, New Hampshire
Populated places established in 1772
Towns in New Hampshire